is a Japanese singer and musician. She released her first solo album in 1981, and worked through the 1980s as the lead vocalist of the new wave band . In 1991, she became the lead singer of the band Pizzicato Five. When the group disbanded in 2001, she embarked on a solo career. She also appears singing solo on the soundtrack of the game We Love Katamari and in the 2008 Japanese version of Just One Second (Jikan Wo Tomete) by London Elektricity.

Solo discography 
 1981: Pink no Kokoro (Pink Heart)
 2000: Miss Maki Nomiya Sings
 2002: Lady Miss Warp
 2004: Dress Code
 2005: Big Bang Romance EP (a/k/a Maki Nomiya Loves M-Flo) (with M-Flo)
 2005: Party People
 2009: Maki-Takai No Jetlag (with Fernanda Takai)
 2012: 30 Greatest Self Covers & More!!!
 2014: Miss Maki Nomiya Sings Shibuya-kei Standards
 2015: What the World Needs Now Is Love
 2016: Un homme et une femme
 2017: Vacances Shibuya-kei wo Utau – Wonderful Summer
 2022: New Beautiful

References

External links 
  

1960 births
Living people
Japanese women singers
Japanese electronic musicians
Japanese dance musicians
Avex Group artists
Shibuya-kei musicians
Musicians from Hokkaido
Pizzicato Five members
People from Kushiro, Hokkaido